Tatiana Pauhofová (born 13 August 1983) is a Slovak actress born in Bratislava.

Life and career

Tatiana (Tania) Pauhofová studied Acting at Academy of Performing Arts in Bratislava. She was chosen among the 'Shooting Stars' of European Film Promotion in 2007.

Beside her roles in films and series in Slovakia and the Czech Republic, she has worked as a theater comedian and also in dubbing and commercials.
As an actress she is perhaps best known for her roles in Kruté radosti (2002), Nezné vlny (2013) and Kousek nebe (2005).
In 2016 she played the leading role of Lida Baarova in The Devil's Mistress, a film that circulated worldwide through Netflix.

Filmography 
"Škriatok" (1995) TV series
Hu-hu bratia (1995) (TV)
Vater wider Willen (1995) (TV)
Caro múdrosti a lásky (1997)
Len treba chciet (1997)
Kruté radosti (2002) .... Valentina
Pokrevní vztahy (2003) .... Marienka
Cert ví proc (2003) .... Princess Anna
Trampoty vodníka Jakoubka (2004) (TV)
Siegfried (2004)
Indián a sestricka (2005) .... Kajovka
Kousek nebe (2005) .... Dana
"Poslední sezóna" (2006) TV series
Polcas rozpadu (2007) (TV)
Tri životy (2007) (TV)
BrainStorm (2008) (TV)
Muzika (2008)
"Soukromé pasti" (2008) TV series ....Season 1/Episode 10
Ženy môjho muža (2009)
Zlatá voci (2009) (TV)
Vlna (2009) TV mini-series
Smog (2009)
"Obchod so štastím" (2009) TV series
Chut leta (2009) (TV film)
Fabrika smrti: mladá krv (2009)
3 sezóny v pekle (3 Seasons in Hell) (2009) .... Hana
True Story of Janosik and Uhorcik (2009) .... 
Terapie (2011) .... Sandra
Burning Bush (2013) .... Dagmar Burešova
The Devil's Mistress (2016) .... Lida Baarova
The Sleepers (Bez vedomí) (2019) - Marie

Theatre

Summer Shakespeare Festival, Prague 
A Midsummer Night's Dream .... Puk (Premiere 27/7/2009 - Lichtenstein Palace)

The Drama Play (SND), Bratislava 
Anna Karenina .... Kitty
Matka Guráž a jej děti .... Kathrin, her mute daughter (Bertolt Brecht, Paul Dessau)
Plantáž .... Sandra
Intrigue and Love .... Luise, her daughter
Three Sisters .... Irina
A Midsummer Night's Dream
Manon Lescaut
Irena Hrováthová: Fetišistky .... Michaela, Maryla's daughter
The Cripple of Inishmaan
Othello
Kocúr na kolieskových korčuliach .... Rebeka Rybková

References

External links 

1983 births
20th-century Slovak actresses
21st-century Slovak actresses
Actors from Bratislava
Living people
Slovak film actresses
Slovak stage actresses
Slovak television actresses